Duke Xiang of Chen (reigned 10th century BC), given name Gaoyang (皋羊), was the third ruler of the ancient Chinese state of Chen during the Western Zhou dynasty. Xiang was his posthumous name. His father Duke Hu of Chen, who married the eldest daughter of King Wu of Zhou, was the founder of the Chen state.

Duke Xiang succeeded his elder brother, Duke Shēn of Chen, who was the second ruler of Chen. When Duke Xiang died, the throne returned to Duke Shēn's son Tu, known as Duke Xiao of Chen.

References

Bibliography

Monarchs of Chen (state)
10th-century BC Chinese monarchs